Ian Wilson may refer to:

In sports
 Ian Wilson (Irish cricketer) (1932–2013), Irish cricketer
 Ian Wilson (New Zealand cricketer) (born 1952), New Zealand cricketer
 Ian Wilson (footballer, born 1923), Scottish football player
 Ian Wilson (footballer, born 1958), Scottish international football player
 Ian Wilson (rower), British lightweight rower
 Ian Wilson (soccer) (born 1960), American soccer player
 Ian Wilson (swimmer) (born 1970), British swimmer

In music and film
 Ian Wilson (actor) (1901–1987), British actor
 Ian Wilson (cinematographer) (1939–2021), English cinematographer
 Ian Wilson (composer) (born 1964), Irish composer
 Ian Wilson (born 1987), drummer for the Scottish pirate metal band Alestorm
 Ian Wilson, vocalist for the American punk band The Star Spangles

Other people
 Ian Wilson (priest) (1920–1988), Dean of Argyll and The Isles
 Ian Wilson (politician) (1932–2013), Australian politician
 Ian Wilson (author) (born 1941), writer on Christianity, history, and science
 Ian E. Wilson (born 1943), chief Librarian and Archivist of Canada
 Ian Wilson (entrepreneur) (born 1943), British entrepreneur and travel writer
 Ian Wilson (phonetician) (born 1966), Canadian professor
 Ian Wilson (biologist) (fl. 2000s), American microbiologist
 Ian Wilson, Grand Master of the Grand Orange Lodge of Scotland
 Ian Wilson, founder of Aurora Foods and Pinnacle Foods
 Ian Wilson, Royal Navy pilot involved in the Alraigo incident